Fletcher Hall, originally called North Hall,  is an historic dormitory building on the campus of the University of Florida in Gainesville, Florida, in the United States. It makes up half of the "F" in the "U.F." in the Murphee Area. The "U.F" in the building design can be seen from an aerial view. It was designed by Rudolph Weaver in the Collegiate Gothic style,  was built in 1938 and was named for Duncan U. Fletcher, longtime U.S. Senator from Florida. It was renovated in 1984.

Fletcher Hall is a contributing property in the University of Florida Campus Historic District which was added to the National Register of Historic Places on April 20, 1989.

See also
University of Florida
Buildings at the University of Florida
University of Florida student housing
Campus Historic District

References

External links
 Virtual tour of University of Florida Campus Historic District at Alachua County's Department of Growth Management
 The University of Florida Historic Campus at UF Facilities Planning & Construction
 George A. Smathers Libraries
 UF Builds: The Architecture of the University of Florida
 Fletcher Hall

National Register of Historic Places in Gainesville, Florida
Buildings at the University of Florida
Rudolph Weaver buildings
Historic district contributing properties in Florida
University and college buildings on the National Register of Historic Places in Florida
University and college buildings completed in 1938
Residential buildings completed in 1938
1938 establishments in Florida